The N-I or N-1 was a derivative of the American Thor-Delta rocket, produced under license in Japan. The N stood for "Nippon" (Japan). It used a Long Tank Thor first stage, a Mitsubishi Heavy Industries-designed LE-3 engine on the second stage, and three Castor SRMs. Seven were launched between 1975 and 1982, before it was replaced by the N-II. Six of the seven launches were successful, however on the fifth flight, there was recontact between the satellite and the third stage, which caused the satellite to fail.

On 29 February 1976, the second N-I conducted the only orbital launch to occur on a leap day.

Launch history

See also
 Comparison of orbital launchers families
Delta rocket
H-I
H-II
H-IIA
N-II (rocket)
PGM-17 Thor

References

Mitsubishi Heavy Industries space launch vehicles
Thor (rocket family)
Vehicles introduced in 1975
Japan–United States relations